Blaxland can refer to:

People
 Gregory Blaxland (1778–1853), pioneer farmer and explorer in Australia, brother of John
 Jasper Blaxland (1880–1963), English consultant surgeon
 John Blaxland (explorer), pioneer settler and explorer in Australia, brother of Gregory Blaxland (1778–1853)
 John Blaxland (politician) (1799–1884), member of NSW Legislative Council, a son of Gregory Blaxland (1778–1853)
 John Blaxland (historian), Australian historian and academic

Other uses
 Blaxland, New South Wales, a small town
 Division of Blaxland, a NSW electoral district in the Australian House of Representatives
 Blaxland, Queensland, a locality in the Western Downs Region

See also
 Blaxlands Ridge, New South Wales, a suburb near Sydney